Ghayyur Akhtar, (5 October 1945 – 7 February 2014) was a radio, television, film and theater actor from Lahore, Pakistan. He is best known for acting a role in the television serial Sona Chandi (1982). He was honored with Pride of Performance Award and Tamgha-e-Imtiaz.

Life and career
Akhtar was born on 5 October 1945 in Lahore, British India. He began his acting career in the late 1964–65 with Radio Pakistan. He was known as "Hameed Bhai (O Ho Ho Ho)" from his performance on the television serial Sona Chandi and Chacha Barkat from Radio Pakistan because of his "O Ho Ho Ho" dialogue. He worked as a writer, actor, director and producer. He shifted his career to television in the 1980s and appeared on PTV classic serials like Sona Chandi, Khawaja and Son, Waris and soaps like Ainak Wala Jin. He also appeared in mainstream cinema in Direct Hawaldar (1985), but television drama remained his major field. In recognition of his services in media, writer and columnist Munnu Bhai wrote two columns called "Gir-e-baan" in his honour. He also appeared on the Din News political talk show Wah Wah as a Chaudary for over a year. Akhtar was decorated with a Pride of Performance award in 2008 and Tamgha-e-Imtiaz. 

Akhtar died on 7 February 2014 in Lahore after a prolonged illness.

Awards

 Pride of Performance Award in 2009
 Tamgha-e-Imtiaz Award in 2003
 Graduate Award [Two times each from Radio Pakistan(1990–91) and TV(1986–87)]
 Graduate Award (2001–02, Radio Pakistan)
 Pakistan Broadcasting Corporation (1999–2000, Organized by Radio)
 PTV Regional Award for Drama Artist (2002–2003).
 Asian Award (1993–94, PTV)
 Musawar Award (1991–92, PTV)
 Baho Award (1993–94, PTV)
 Shezan Award (1994–95, PTV)

Television

List of television plays

 Afsar Bekaar-e-Khaas (PTV)
 Ainak Wala Jin (PTV)
 Alif Laila
 Ambar Maria
 Bao Train
 Bhola Khanjar
 Chaan bura
 Chacha Chaudary Plus ATV (Pakistan)
 Comedy Theatre
 Din (PTV)
 Do tok (Funny Talk Show) ATV (Pakistan)
 Double Sawari (PTV)
 Faraib
 Ghar aya mera Pardesi ATV (Pakistan)
 Gharana
 Hawa pe Raqs (PTV)
 Inkar
 Jaza Saza
 Jheel
 Khair Khwah
 Khawab Azaab
 Khawaja and Son (PTV)
 Manzil
 Munnu ki Kahani (PTV)
 Muskurahat
 Nigah
 Pappu plaza
 Parvaz
 Pathjhar (PTV)
 Piyas
 Rahain (PTV)
 Ranjish
 Saaray Gaamay (PTV)
 Sohail Clinic (Guest appearance) ATV (Pakistan)
 Sona Chandi (PTV)
 Tarair
 Us Paar (PTV)
 Waqt
 Waris (PTV)
 Zangeer
 Zehar-baad

Theatre

List of stage dramas

 Ab kya hoga
 Aik billi teen kabutar
 Aik thi billo
 Ainak wala Jin
 Andar ana mana hai
 Baat samjh mai a gai
 Best of Luck
 Budha, Trank aur Boski
 Changaiz Khan in Lahore
 Dard na janay koi
 Dulha yahan Dulhan kahan
 Ganjay Farishtay
 Ham se bhar kar kon
 Hawa ki beti
 Hello uncle
 High jump
 Huqa pag te Restaurant
 Jahil family te mai 8th pass
 Janam janam ki maili chaadar
 Janoon
 Khatara 440Watt
 Kisa ik muhabat ka
 Kut-kutarian (Part-1 and part-2)
 Laddan patti
 Lalay di jaan
 Lotay aur Lifafay
 Mai khoobsurat hu
 Mirza Ghalib band road per
 Mohabbat is ko kehtay hain
 Mr Baazigar
 Naam k Nawab
 Naya makaan
 No chance
 No lift
 Paisa bolta hai
 Raatain jaagti hain
 Shohar bechara
 Suzi and Sandow
 Tera munda bigara jaye
 Thori si shararat
 Tota toop chalaye ga
 Waiting room
 Wife  wohti
 Ye becharay log
 Zarurat rishta

References

1945 births
2014 deaths
20th-century Pakistani male actors
21st-century Pakistani male actors
Male actors from Lahore
People from Lahore
Pakistani male television actors
Pakistani male stage actors
Pakistani stand-up comedians
Punjabi people
PTV Award winners
Recipients of the Pride of Performance